The men's major golf championships, commonly known as the major championships, and often referred to simply as the majors, are the most prestigious tournaments in golf. Historically, the national open and amateur championships of Great Britain and the United States were regarded as the majors. With the rise of professional golf in the middle of the twentieth century, the majors came to refer to the most prestigious professional tournaments.

In modern men's professional golf, there are four globally recognised major championships. Since 2019, the order of competition dates are as follows:

 Masters Tournament in April; hosted as an invitational by and at Augusta National Golf Club in Augusta, Georgia, U.S. 
 PGA Championship in May; hosted by the PGA of America and played at various locations in the U.S. 
 U.S. Open in June; hosted by the United States Golf Association (USGA), played at various locations in the U.S. 
 The Open Championship in July; hosted by The R&A and played on a links course at various locations in the U.K.

Overview

History
The majors originally consisted of two British tournaments, The Open Championship and The Amateur Championship, and two American tournaments, the U.S. Open and the U.S. Amateur. With the introduction of the Masters Tournament in 1934, and the rise of professional golf in the late 1940s and 1950s, the term "major championships" eventually came to describe the Masters, the U.S. Open, the Open Championship, and the PGA Championship. It is difficult to determine when the definition changed to include the current four tournaments, although many trace it to Arnold Palmer's 1960 season. After winning the Masters and the U.S. Open to start the season, he remarked that if he could win the Open Championship and PGA Championship to finish the season, he would complete "a grand slam of his own" to rival Bobby Jones's 1930 feat. Until that time, many U.S. players such as Byron Nelson also considered the Western Open and the North and South Open as two of golf's "majors", and the British PGA Matchplay Championship was as important to British and Commonwealth professionals as the PGA Championship was to Americans.

During the 1950s, the short-lived World Championship of Golf was viewed as a "major" by its competitors, as its first prize was worth almost ten times any other event in the game, and it was the first event whose finale was televised live on U.S. television. The oldest of the majors is The Open Championship, commonly referred to as the "British Open" outside the United Kingdom. Dominated by American champions in the 1920s and 1930s, the comparative explosion in the riches available on the U.S. Tour from the 1940s onwards meant that the lengthy overseas trip needed to qualify and compete in the event became increasingly prohibitive for the leading American professionals. Their regular participation dwindled after the war years. Ben Hogan entered just once in 1953 and won, but never returned. Sam Snead won in 1946 but lost money on the trip (first prize was $600) and did not return until 1962.

Golf writer Dan Jenkins, who was often seen as the world authority on majors since he had attended more (200+) than anyone else, once noted that "the pros didn't talk much about majors back then.  I think it was Herbert Warren Wind who starting using the term. He said golfers had to be judged by the major tournaments they won, but it's not like there was any set number of major tournaments."

In 1960, Arnold Palmer entered The Open Championship in an attempt to emulate Hogan's 1953 feat of winning on his first visit. Though a runner-up by a stroke in his first attempt, Palmer returned and won the next two in 1961 and 1962. Scheduling difficulties persisted with the PGA Championship, but more Americans began competing in the 1960s, restoring the event's prestige (and with it the prize money that once made it an attractive prospect to other American pros). The advent of transatlantic jet travel helped to boost American participation in The Open. A discussion between Palmer and Pittsburgh golf writer Bob Drum led to the concept of the modern Grand Slam of Golf.

In August 2017, after the previous year's edition was scheduled earlier due to golf at the 2016 Summer Olympics, the PGA of America announced that the PGA Championship would be moved to late-May beginning in 2019, in between the Masters and U.S. Open. The PGA Tour concurrently announced that it would move the Players Championship back to March the same year; as a result, the Players and the four majors will still be played across five consecutive months.

Importance
Alongside the biennial Ryder Cup team competition, the majors are golf's most important events. Elite players from all over the world participate in them, and the reputations of the greatest players in golf history are largely based on the number and variety of major championship victories they accumulate. The top prizes are not actually the largest in golf, being surpassed by The Players Championship, three of the four World Golf Championships events (the HSBC Champions, promoted to WGC status in 2009, has a top prize comparable to that of the majors), and some other invitational events. However, winning a major boosts a player's career far more than winning any other tournament. If he is already a leading player, he will probably receive large bonuses from his sponsors and may be able to negotiate better contracts. If he is an unknown, he will immediately be signed up. Perhaps more importantly, he will receive an exemption from the need to annually re-qualify for a tour card on his home tour, thus giving a tournament golfer some security in an unstable profession. Currently, both the PGA Tour and European Tour give a five-year exemption to all major winners and they receive the highest priority in those rankings.

Independent organizations, and not the PGA Tour, operate each of the majors; The Players Championship is the tour's most important event. Three of the four majors take place in the United States. The Masters is played at the same course, Augusta National Golf Club, every year, while the other three rotate courses (the Open Championship, however, is always played on a links course). Each of the majors has a distinct history, and they are run by four separate golf organizations, but their special status is recognized worldwide. Major championship winners receive the maximum possible allocation of 100 points from the Official World Golf Ranking, which is endorsed by all of the main tours, and major championship prize money is official on the three richest regular (i.e. under-50) golf tours, the PGA Tour, European Tour and Japan Golf Tour.

The Players historically has offered a prize pool as large as or larger than the majors, because the PGA Tour wants its most important event to be as attractive. Although the majors are considered prestigious due to their history and traditions, besides The Players there are still other non-"major" tournaments which prominently feature top players competing for purses meeting or exceeding those of the four traditional majors, such as the European Tour's DP World Tour Championship, Dubai, and World Golf Championships. With its large prize fund of any golf event and role as PGA Tour's flagship tournament, The Players is frequently considered to be an unofficial "fifth major" by players and critics. After the announcement that the Evian Masters would be recognized as the fifth women's major by the LPGA Tour, players objected to the concept of having a fifth men's major, owing to the long-standing traditions that the existing four have established.

Distinctive characteristics of majors
Because each major was developed and is run by a different organization, each has characteristics that sets it apart. These involve the character of the courses used, the composition of the field, and other idiosyncrasies.
 The Masters Tournament (sometimes referred to as the U.S. Masters), the season's first major championship, is the only major that is played at the same course every year (Augusta National Golf Club), being the invitational tournament of that club. The Masters invites the smallest field of the majors, generally under 100 players (although, like all the majors, it now ensures entry for all golfers among the world's top 50 before the event), and is the only one of the four majors that does not use "alternates" to replace qualified players who do not enter the event (usually due to injury). Former champions have a lifetime invitation to compete, and also included in the field are the current champions of the major amateur championships, and most of the previous year's PGA Tour winners (although winners of "alternate" events held opposite a high-profile tournament do not receive automatic invitations). The traditions of Augusta during Tournament week, such as the Champion's Dinner, Par 3 Contest, and awarding of a green jacket to the champion, create a distinctive character for the tournament, as does the course itself, with its lack of primary rough but severely undulating fairways and greens, traditional pin placements, and punitive use of ponds and creeks on several key holes on the back nine.
 The PGA Championship (sometimes referred to as the U.S. PGA), which from 2019 is the year's second major, is traditionally played at a parkland club in the United States, and the courses chosen tend to be as difficult as those chosen for the U.S. Open, with several, such as Baltusrol Golf Club, Medinah Country Club, Oakland Hills Country Club, Oak Hill Country Club, and Winged Foot Golf Club, having hosted both.  The PGA generally does not set up the course to be as difficult as the USGA does.  The PGA of America enters into a profit-sharing agreement with the host club. (An exception was in 2014, when the tournament was held at Valhalla Golf Club in Louisville, Kentucky, a club that the PGA of America fully owned at the time.)  As with The Masters, previous winners of the PGA Championship have a lifetime invitation to compete. As well as inviting recent champions of the other three professional majors and leading players from the world rankings, the PGA Championship field is completed by qualifiers held among members of the PGA of America, the organization of club and teaching professionals that are separate from the members of the PGA Tour. The PGA Championship is also the only one of the four majors to invite all winners of PGA Tour events in the year preceding the tournament, as well as inviting 20 club professionals who are non-tour regulars. Amateur golfers do not normally play on the PGA Tour, and could only qualify by winning one of the other three majors, winning a PGA Tour event while playing under a sponsor's exemption, or having a high world ranking. When the PGA Championship was held in August, it was frequently affected by the high heat and humidity that characterize the summer climate of much of the U.S., which often set it apart as a challenge from (in particular) the Open Championship, an event often played in cooler and rainy weather. With the 2019 move to a May date, heat and humidity are less likely to have major effects on the competition.
 The third major, the U.S. Open, is notorious for being played on difficult courses that have tight fairways, challenging greens, demanding pin positions and thick and high rough, placing a great premium on accuracy, especially with driving and approach play. Additionally, while most regular tour events are played on courses with par 72, the U.S. Open has almost never been held on a par-72 course in recent decades; the 2017 event was the first since 1992 to be played at par 72. During this time, the tournament course has occasionally been played to a par of 71 but most commonly par 70. The U.S. Open is rarely won with a score much under par.  The event is the championship of the United States Golf Association, and in having a very strict exempt qualifiers list – made up of recent major champions, professionals currently ranked high in the world rankings or on the previous year's money lists around the world, and leading amateurs from recent USGA events – about half of the 156-person field still enters the tournament through two rounds of open qualification events, mostly held in the U.S. but also in Europe and Japan. The U.S. Open has no barrier to entry for either women or junior players, as long as they are a professional or meet amateur handicap requirements. As of 2022, however, no female golfer has yet qualified for the U.S. Open, although in 2006 Michelle Wie made it to the second qualifying stage.  While the U.S. Open employed an 18-hole playoff for many years if players were tied after four rounds, the USGA announced that beginning in 2018 all of its future championships would implement a two-hole aggregate playoff format. A sudden-death playoff would follow if the players were still tied after the two playoff holes. (This change also brought the U.S. Open more in line with both the Open and PGA Championships, which use four- and three-hole aggregate playoffs respectively, followed by sudden death if necessary, and most regular events as well as the Masters only have simple sudden-death playoffs.) The Sunday of the Championship has also in recent years fallen on Father's Day (at least as recognized in the US and the UK) which has lent added poignancy to winners' speeches.
 The year's final major, The Open Championship (sometimes referred to as the British Open), is organized by The R&A, an offshoot of The Royal and Ancient Golf Club of St Andrews, and is typically played on a links-style course in the United Kingdom (primarily Scotland or England). It carries the prestige of being the oldest professional golf tournament currently in existence and the original "Open" championship (although the very first event was held only for British professionals). It is respected for maintaining the tradition of links play that dates back to the very invention of the game in Scotland. Links courses are generally typified as coastal, flat and often very windswept, with the fairways cut through dune grass and gorse bushes that make up the "rough", and have deep bunkers. The course is generally not "doctored" to make it more difficult, effectively making the variable weather the main external influence on the field's score. In fact, the greens at Open venues tend to be set up to play more slowly than those of normal tour stops. In windy conditions, a course with fast greens can become unplayable because the wind could affect balls at rest; the third round of the 2015 Open saw many delays for this very reason. As well as exempting from qualifying recent professional major and amateur champions, all former Open Championship winners under age 60, and leading players from the world rankings, the R&A ensures that leading golfers from around the globe are given the chance to enter by holding qualifying events on all continents, as well as holding final qualifying events around the UK in the weeks before the main tournament. The champion receives (and has his name inscribed on the base of) the famous Claret Jug, a trophy that dates back to 1872 (champions from 1860 until 1871 received instead a championship belt, much like a champion professional boxer's belt nowadays) and the engraving of the champions' name on the trophy before them receiving it is, in itself, one of the traditions of the closing ceremony of the championship, as is the award of the silver medal to the leading amateur player to have made the cut to play the last 36 holes.

Television coverage

United Kingdom 

In the United Kingdom, historically all four majors were broadcast on free to air TV. ITV has not broadcast live golf for many years. The BBC used to be the exclusive TV home of the Masters Tournament, U.S. Open and the Open Championship. By the early years of the first decade of the 21st century, only the Masters and Open Championship were broadcast live on the BBC. From 2011 onwards Sky Sports has exclusive live coverage of the first two days of the Masters, with the weekend rounds shared with the BBC. The U.S. Open is shown exclusively on Sky Sports. Beginning in 2016, Sky Sports also became the exclusive broadcaster of the Open Championship; the BBC elected to forego the final year of its contract. The BBC continues to hold rights to broadcast a nightly highlights programme.

Sky also held rights to the PGA Championship, but in July 2017, it was reported that the PGA of America had declined to renew its contract, seeking a different media model for the tournament in the United Kingdom. The 2017 tournament was aired by the BBC (via BBC Red Button, with the conclusion of coverage on BBC Two) and streamed by GiveMeSport (via Facebook Live). Eleven Sports UK & Ireland acquired the event for 2018, as one of the first events covered by the newly launched streaming service.

United States

As none of the majors fall under the direct jurisdiction of tours, broadcast rights for these events are negotiated separately with each sanctioning body. However, as of 2020, network television coverage of all four tournaments is split equally between the PGA Tour's two main television partners, CBS and NBC.

The Masters operates under one-year contracts; CBS has been the main TV partner every year since 1956, with ESPN broadcasting CBS-produced coverage of the first and second rounds since 2008 (replacing USA Network, which had shown the event since the early 1980s).

Beginning in 1966, ABC obtained the broadcast rights for the other three majors and held them for a quarter century. The PGA Championship moved to CBS in 1991 and the U.S. Open returned to NBC in 1995. ABC retained The Open Championship as its sole major, but moved its live coverage on the weekend to sister cable network ESPN in 2010. In June 2015, it was announced that NBC and Golf Channel would acquire rights to the Open Championship under a 12-year deal. While the NBC deal was originally to take effect in 2017, ESPN chose to opt out of its final year of Open rights, so the NBC contract took effect beginning in 2016 instead.

As of 2020, NBC and Golf Channel hold broadcast rights to the U.S. Open and other USGA events, replacing Fox Sports — which had assumed the rights in 2015 under a 12-year contract, but withdrew and sold the remainder of the rights to NBC in June 2020.

As of 2020, CBS and ESPN hold the broadcast rights to the PGA Championship, under a new contract that replaces TNT as the tournament's cable partner.

In November 2021, NBC announced that early round and early-weekend coverage of the U.S. Open and the Open Championship would move from Golf Channel to USA Network beginning in 2022.

Major championship winners

Records

Scoring records

Winning total (aggregate)
The aggregate scoring records for each major are tabulated below, listed in order of when the majors are scheduled annually.

Winning total (to par)
The scoring records to par for each major are tabulated below, listed in order of when the majors are scheduled annually.

Largest margins of victory
Major championships have been won by a margin of nine strokes or greater on eight occasions. On a further eight occasions, majors have been won by a margin of eight strokes; they include the 2012 PGA Championship, which was played over the Ocean Course at the Kiawah Island Golf Resort, for which Rory McIlroy holds the PGA Championship record.

Single round records

The record for a single round in a major championship is 62 which was recorded by South African golfer Branden Grace in the third round of the 2017 Open Championship.

Consecutive victories

 These are consecutive because there was no The Open Championship in 1871 and no PGA Championship in 1917 and 1918.

Wire-to-wire victories
Players who have led or been tied for the lead after each round of a major.

Outright leader after every round

At least tied for the lead at the end of every round

Top ten finishes in all four modern majors in one season
It was rare, before the early 1960s, for the leading players from around the world to have the opportunity to compete in all four of the 'modern' majors in one season, because of the different qualifying criteria used in each at the time, the costs of traveling to compete (in an era when tournament prize money was very low, and only the champion himself would earn the chance of ongoing endorsements), and on occasion even the conflicting scheduling of the Open and PGA Championships. In 1937, the U.S. Ryder Cup side all competed in The Open Championship, but of those who finished in the top ten of that event, only Ed Dudley could claim a "top ten" finish in all four of the majors in 1937, if his defeat in the last-16 round of that year's PGA Championship (then at matchplay) was considered a "joint 9th" position.

Following 1960, when Arnold Palmer's narrowly failed bid to add the Open Championship to his Masters and U.S. Open titles (and thus emulate Hogan's 1953 "triple crown") helped to establish the concept of the modern professional "Grand Slam", it has become commonplace for the leading players to be invited to, and indeed compete in, all four majors each year. Even so, those who have recorded top-ten finishes in all four, in a single year, remains a small and select group.

^ Never won a regular tour major championship in his career.

On 14 of the 28 occasions the feat has been achieved, the player in question did not win a major that year – indeed, three of the players (Dudley, Sanders and Barber) failed to win a major championship in their careers (although Barber would go on to win five senior majors), and Fowler has also yet to win one.

Multiple victories in a calendar year

Four
 1930:  Bobby Jones; The Open Championship, U.S. Open, U.S. Amateur Championship, The Amateur Championship

Three
 1953:  Ben Hogan; Masters Tournament, U.S. Open, and The Open Championship; he was unable to play in both the Open Championship and the PGA Championship because the dates effectively overlapped.
 2000:  Tiger Woods; U.S. Open, The Open Championship, and PGA Championship

Two

Masters and U.S. Open
 1941:  Craig Wood
 1951:  Ben Hogan
 1960:  Arnold Palmer
 1972:  Jack Nicklaus
 2002:  Tiger Woods
 2015:  Jordan Spieth

Masters and Open Championship
 1962:  Arnold Palmer
 1966:  Jack Nicklaus
 1974:  Gary Player
 1977:  Tom Watson
 1990:  Nick Faldo
 1998:  Mark O'Meara
 2005:  Tiger Woods

Masters and PGA Championship
 1949:  Sam Snead
 1956:  Jack Burke Jr
 1963:  Jack Nicklaus
 1975:  Jack Nicklaus

U.S. Open and Open Championship
 1926:  Bobby Jones
 1932:  Gene Sarazen
 1971:  Lee Trevino
 1982:  Tom Watson

U.S. Open and PGA Championship
 1922:  Gene Sarazen
 1948:  Ben Hogan
 1980:  Jack Nicklaus
 2018:  Brooks Koepka

Open Championship and PGA Championship
 1924:  Walter Hagen
 1994:  Nick Price
 2006:  Tiger Woods
 2008:  Pádraig Harrington
 2014:  Rory McIlroy

Consecutive victories (spanning years)

Four
 1868–1872:  Young Tom Morris 1868 Open, 1869 Open, 1870 Open, 1872 Open (No Open Championship played in 1871)
 1930:  Bobby Jones 1930 Amateur, 1930 Open, 1930 U.S. Open, 1930 U.S. Amateur
 2000–01:  Tiger Woods 2000 U.S. Open, 2000 Open, 2000 PGA, 2001 Masters

Three
 1877–1879:  Jamie Anderson 1877 Open, 1878 Open, 1879 Open
 1880–1882:  Bob Ferguson 1880 Open, 1881 Open, 1882 Open

Two
Note: The order in which the majors were contested varied between 1895 and 1953. Before 1916, the PGA Championship did not exist; Before 1934, the Masters did not exist. From 1954 through 2018, the order of the majors was Masters, U.S. Open, Open Championship, PGA except in 1971, when the PGA was played before the Masters. From 2019, the order has been Masters, PGA, U.S. Open, Open Championship.

 1861–62:  Old Tom Morris 1861 Open, 1862 Open
 1894–95:  J.H. Taylor 1894 Open, 1895 Open
 1920–21:  Jock Hutchison 1920 PGA, 1921 Open (The Open Championship was the first major contested in 1921)
 1921–22:  Walter Hagen 1921 PGA, 1922 Open (The Open Championship was the first major contested in 1922)
 1922:  Gene Sarazen 1922 U.S. Open, 1922 PGA
 1924:  Walter Hagen 1924 Open, 1924 PGA
 1926:  Bobby Jones 1926 Open, 1926 U.S. Open (The Open Championship was played before the U.S. Open in 1926) 
 1927–28:  Walter Hagen 1927 PGA, 1928 Open (The Open Championship was the first major contested in 1928)
 1930–31:  Tommy Armour 1930 PGA, 1931 Open (The Open Championship was the first major contested in 1931)
 1932:  Gene Sarazen 1932 Open, 1932 U.S. Open (The Open Championship was the first major contested in 1932, followed by the U.S. Open)
 1941:  Craig Wood 1941 Masters, 1941 U.S. Open
 1948:  Ben Hogan 1948 PGA, 1948 U.S. Open (The PGA was played between the Masters and U.S. Open in 1948)
 1949:  Sam Snead 1949 Masters, 1949 PGA (As in 1948, the 1949 PGA was played between the Masters and U.S. Open)
 1951:  Ben Hogan 1951 Masters, 1951 U.S. Open

 1953:  Ben Hogan; 1953 Masters, 1953 U.S. Open (The 1953 Open Championship, also won by Hogan, was actually concluded only 3 days after 1953 PGA; he chose not to play in the PGA because of the strain on his legs, and the conflict with the Open championship.)
 1960:  Arnold Palmer 1960 Masters, 1960 U.S. Open
 1971:  Lee Trevino 1971 U.S. Open, 1971 Open
 1972:  Jack Nicklaus 1972 Masters, 1972 U.S. Open (The 1971 PGA, also won by Nicklaus, was not consecutive due to being played before the Masters in 1971) 
 1982:  Tom Watson 1982 U.S. Open, 1982 Open
 1994:  Nick Price 1994 Open, 1994 PGA
 2002:  Tiger Woods 2002 Masters, 2002 U.S. Open
 2005–06:  Phil Mickelson 2005 PGA, 2006 Masters
 2006:  Tiger Woods 2006 Open, 2006 PGA
 2008:  Pádraig Harrington 2008 Open, 2008 PGA
 2014:  Rory McIlroy 2014 Open, 2014 PGA
 2015:  Jordan Spieth 2015 Masters, 2015 U.S. Open

Most runner-up finishes

For the purposes of this section a runner-up is defined as someone who either (i) tied for the lead after 72 holes (or 36 holes in the case of the early championships) but lost the playoff or (ii) finished alone or in a tie for second place. In a few instances players have been involved in a playoff for the win or for second place prize money and have ended up taking the third prize (e.g. 1870 Open Championship, 1966 Masters Tournament). For match play PGA Championships up to 1957 the runner-up is the losing finalist.

Along with his record 18 major victories, Jack Nicklaus also holds the record for most runner-up finishes in major championships, with 19, including a record 7 at the Open Championship. He is also the only golfer with multiple runner-up finishes in all four majors. Phil Mickelson has the second most with 11 runner-up finishes after the 2016 Open Championship, which includes a record 6 runner-up finishes at the U.S. Open, the one major he has never won. Arnold Palmer had 10 second places, including three in the major he never won, the PGA Championship. There have been three golfers with 8 runner-up finishes – Sam Snead, Greg Norman and Tom Watson. Norman shares the distinction of having lost playoffs in each of the four majors with Craig Wood (who lost the 1934 PGA final – at match play – on the second extra hole).
 Jack Nicklaus: 19 (1960–1983)
 Phil Mickelson: 11 (1999–2016)
 Arnold Palmer: 10 (1960–1970)
 Sam Snead: 8 (1937–1957)
 Greg Norman: 8 (1984–1996)
 Tom Watson: 8 (1978–2009)

Most runner-up finishes without a victory
 Colin Montgomerie 5: U.S. Open 1994, 1997, 2006; Open 2005; PGA 1995
/ Harry Cooper 4: U.S. Open 1927, 1936; Masters 1936, 1938
 Doug Sanders 4: U.S. Open 1961; Open 1966, 1970; PGA 1959
 Bruce Crampton 4: Masters 1972; U.S. Open 1972; PGA 1973, 1975
 Crampton was second to Jack Nicklaus on each occasion.

Most appearances

Lee Westwood holds the record for the most major championship appearances without a victory, with 91 starts.

See also
 Chronological list of men's major golf champions
 List of men's major championships winning golfers
 Triple Crown of Golf
Women's major golf championships

References

External links
 Coverage of the four majors by the PGA of America
 Listing of golf major championship courses, winners and countries

 
Golf terminology